"Why You Always Hatin?" is a song by American rapper YG featuring Canadian rapper Drake and fellow American rapper Kamaiyah. It was released as the third single from YG's second studio album Still Brazy on May 21, 2016. YG previously worked with Drake on "Who Do You Love".

Music video
The song's accompanying music video premiered on August 15, 2016 on YG's Vevo YouTube account.

Charts

Weekly charts

Year-end charts

Certifications

References

2016 songs
2016 singles
YG (rapper) songs
Drake (musician) songs
Def Jam Recordings singles
Songs written by Drake (musician)
Songs written by YG (rapper)